The 1943 NCAA Swimming and Diving Championships were contested in March 1943 at the Ohio State Natatorium at Ohio State University in Columbus, Ohio at the seventh annual NCAA-sanctioned swim meet to determine the team and individual national champions of men's collegiate swimming and diving in the United States. 

Hosts Ohio State topped the team standings, the Buckeyes' first title in program history. Ohio State had finished in second or third place in each of the previous six championships.

Team standings
Note: Top 10 only
(H) = Hosts

See also
List of college swimming and diving teams

References

NCAA Division I Men's Swimming and Diving Championships
NCAA Swimming And Diving Championships
NCAA Swimming And Diving Championships
NCAA Swimming And Diving Championships